Adrian Stuart Bromage (born 11 May 1971) is a businessman and former Australian rules footballer who most notably played for  in the Western Australian Football League (WAFL) during the 1990s. He was the winner of the Sandover Medal for the best and fairest player in the 1998 Westar Rules season.

Early career
Originally from Bruthen, Victoria, Bromage played senior football for the Bairnsdale Football Club in the Gippsland Football League (GFL) from the age of 16. He was selected to play for Victoria Country in the Teal Cup, but neglected a career in the Australian Football League (AFL) for university.

WAFL career
While on a trip around Australia, Bromage arrived in Perth, where was recruited by  ahead of the 1996 WAFL season. He played 13 games in 1996, and another 16 in 1997, playing in the Sharks' losing grand final team in 1997. He had a stand-out season in 1998, winning both the Sandover Medal, for the best player in the competition, and the Simpson Medal, for the best player in the Sharks' premiership-winning grand final team. Bromage left the WAFL at the end of 1998 to pursue business interests in Gippsland. After spending 1999 overseas, Bromage returned to Bairnsdale Football Club. At Bairnsdale, he coached for five seasons, winning four premierships during that time.

Business career
Bromage owned and managed the Moorings at Metung in the 2000’s and developed 5knots, a boutique accommodation complex in Metung. He also served as Chairperson of East Gippsland Region Business and Tourism Association and the Shire’s Tourism Advisory Board, as well as the East Gippsland Economic Development Advisory board.

Bromage spent 7 years with the AFL, until late 2019, as a Gippsland Football Development Manager and is now the current Managing Director of Metung Hot Springs.

References

1971 births
Australian rules footballers from Victoria (Australia)
Bairnsdale Football Club players
East Fremantle Football Club players
Living people
People from Bairnsdale
Sandover Medal winners